Josh Holmes (born 6 January 1987, in Sydney) is an Australian rugby union player. He has played Super Rugby for the Western Force, Brumbies, and New South Wales Waratahs. His preferred position is scrum half.

Career
Holmes made his provincial debut for the Waratahs as an 18-year-old in 2005, but did not play Super 14 until 2007, when he made his debut for the Waratahs against the Brumbies. He racked up 4 caps before moving to the Brumbies in the wake of George Gregan's departure.

Holmes was competing with Patrick Phibbs for the starting position at the Brumbies side, but spent the next two seasons with playing in every game, whether starting or on the bench.

In 2010, he returned to the Waratahs on a two-year deal. He joined the Western Force in April 2012 to cover injured players James Stannard and Justin Turner. In May 2014, he signed a short-term contract with the Melbourne Rebels as injury replacement for Nic Stirzaker.

Family
Holmes' older brother Luke also plays Super Rugby.

Wife- Sarah Holmes

References

External links

itsrugby.co.uk Profile

Australian rugby union players
ACT Brumbies players
1987 births
Living people
Western Force players
New South Wales Waratahs players
Rugby union scrum-halves
Australian expatriate rugby union players
Expatriate rugby union players in France
Australian expatriate sportspeople in France
CS Bourgoin-Jallieu players
Melbourne Rebels players
Sydney (NRC team) players
Rugby union players from Sydney